Jonathan Karp is an American book editor, publisher, and writer. He is the publisher, president, and chief executive of Simon & Schuster, and has also led the company's flagship division. Karp also founded Twelve, an imprint at the Hachette Book Group, and was the editor-in-chief of Random House.

Early life and education
Karp was born to a Jewish family and raised in the Short Hills section of Millburn, New Jersey. His mother worked as a schoolteacher and his father served as chairman and chief executive officer at a bank. Karp graduated from Brown University in 1986, where he majored in American civilization and served as president and editor of the student publication, The Brown Daily Herald. He wrote his master's thesis on Herman Wouk's novels.

Career
Karp wrote for The Washington Post in the mid 1980s, then worked as a reporter for The Providence Journal and the Miami Herald. He then relocated to New York City to pursue his interests in books and theatre.

Karp joined Random House in 1989 as an editorial assistant, and by 2000 he was serving as vice president and senior editor. In July 2000, he was promoted to the role of publisher of '@Random', the company's e-book branch, and eventually worked his way up to editor-in-chief of Random House. He worked for Random House for sixteen years, with one interruption; in 2000, he left the publisher to head producer Scott Rudin's office in New York (Scott Rudin Productions) as vice president of development. However, he returned to Bertelsmann several weeks later.

Karp then served as publisher and editor-in-chief of Twelve, an imprint he established within the Hachette Book Group in 2005, which publishes one book per month. Fifteen of Twelve's first thirty books appeared on The New York Times Best Seller list.

In mid 2010, Karp left Hachette to become Simon & Schuster's publisher, and was subsequently named president of the flagship division. On 29 May 2020, he became the CEO of Simon & Schuster.

Theatre and television
Karp met composer Seth Weinstein during their two-year apprenticeship at the BMI Lehman Engel Musical Theatre Workshop, in Manhattan in 1996. The duo wrote The Kugelmass Affair, which is based on a short story by Woody Allen.

In 2000, Karp co-directed Big Kiss: An Evening of Humiliating Audition Stories with Alford, who wrote Big Kiss: One Actor's Desperate Attempt to Claw His Way to the Top. The show featured Alford and other actors performing self-written monologues about their most embarrassing audition experiences.

Karp and Weinstein's second musical, Heart Throb, premiered at the Producers Club in 2001. The duo later collaborated on How to Save the World and Find True Love in 90 Minutes, with Karp writing the book and lyrics. The Off-Broadway musical comedy, which is about a United Nations tour guide who realizes his ability to read minds after getting hit in the head by a melon, was first presented as I Know What You're Thinking in September 2000 at the New York International Fringe Festival and later ran at the arts complex New World Stages.

In May 2011, Karp made a cameo appearance on the finale of Gossip Girl fourth season ("The Wrong Goodbye"), in which he negotiates a manuscript deal with one of the show's main characters. He later appeared on the season five episodes "The Jewel of Denial" (October 10, 2011) and "Father and the Bride" (January 23, 2012).

Controversy
In 2022, Simon & Schuster sold 900 autographed copies of Bob Dylan’s book of essays, “The Philosophy of Modern Song.” Accompanying each $600 book was a letter of authenticity signed by Karp, the publisher’s chief executive, indicating that the books had been hand signed by Dylan. According to a New York Times article, when the books arrived, readers immediately noticed that the autographs appeared to have been machine generated by an auto pen. While Simon & Schuster initially denounced the “online rumors,” intense pressure led the publishing house to send out an “acknowledgment” that the autograph had been rendered “in a penned replica form.” Buyers were then provided a refund. Karp and Simon & Schuster declined further comment.

See also
 List of Brown University people

References

Further reading

External links

 Profile: Jonathan Karp at Bloomberg L.P.
 Karp at C-SPAN
 
 

20th-century American non-fiction writers
21st-century American non-fiction writers
American book editors
American dramatists and playwrights
American newspaper editors
American newspaper reporters and correspondents
American newspaper writers
Brown University alumni
People from Millburn, New Jersey
Writers from New York City
American publishers (people)
Random House
Miami Herald people
The Providence Journal people
The Washington Post people
Living people
1964 births
Year of birth uncertain
Jewish American writers
20th-century American male writers
American male non-fiction writers
21st-century American male writers
21st-century American Jews